Gary Montgomery may refer to:
 Gary Montgomery (sportsman)
 Gary Montgomery (artist)